Edward John Hinson nicknamed "Blinko" (1913–1986) was an Australian rugby league player who played in the 1930s and 1940s.

He later became an Olympic wrestler and an Australian heavyweight champion.

Background
Hinson was born in Redfern, New South Wales on 11 July 1913.

Playing career
Hinson went on to play ten seasons with South Sydney between 1934-1945 and was known to eat six raw eggs before every game. Hinson was a lock-forward and played in two Grand Finals for Souths, in 1935 and 1939 although, the team were runners-up on both occasions. He retired aged 35 at the end of the 1945 NSWRFL season.

Death
Hinson died on 27 August 1986, aged 73.

References

1913 births
1986 deaths
South Sydney Rabbitohs players
Australian rugby league players
Rugby league locks
Rugby league second-rows
Rugby league players from Sydney
South Sydney Rabbitohs captains